Tor Rødseth (1928 – 2007) was a Norwegian economist.

He was born in Harstad, and graduated with the cand.oecon. degree in 1952. He was a docent at the Norwegian School of Economics and Business Administration from 1962 to 1974 and a professor at the University of Bergen from 1974 to 1993.

References

1928 births
2007 deaths
Norwegian economists
Academic staff of the Norwegian School of Economics
Academic staff of the University of Bergen
People from Harstad